is a former Nippon Professional Baseball pitcher.

External links

References

1961 births
Living people
Baseball people from Nara Prefecture
Japanese baseball players
Nippon Professional Baseball pitchers
Chunichi Dragons players
Lotte Orions players
Chiba Lotte Marines players
Managers of baseball teams in Japan
Yokohama DeNA BayStars managers